The Duarte Unified School District is a school district located in Duarte, California. The district serves students from Duarte, Bradbury and the unincorporated southern portions of Duarte and Monrovia. The district is relatively small, containing only 1 elementary (K-6) school, 4 K-8 schools, 1 comprehensive high school and 1 continuation high school. The population of students served in the district is socio-economically diverse, and culturally rich.

Governance

Superintendent's Office
The current superintendent for the Duarte Unified School District is Gordon Amerson.

Board of Education
The current members of the Board of Education are:

 Reyna Diaz
 Cecilia Carroll
 Tom Reyes
 Dr. James Finlay
 Kenneth Bell

The Board of Education members are elected at-large and to a four-year term. The elections are held on a first Tuesday after the first Monday in November of even-numbered years along with the Los Angeles County, California state and federal general elections starting with the 2018 election.

Schools

Elementary and Middle (TK-8)
Andres Duarte Arts Academy
Beardslee Dual Immersion Academy
Maxwell International Baccalaureate Academy
Royal Oaks STEAM Academy
Valley View Academy of Technology and Creative Learning (K-6)

High (9-12)
Duarte High School

Head Start & State Preschool (4-year olds)
Andres Duarte Elementary
Beardslee Elementary
Maxwell Elementary

State Preschool (3-year olds)
Andres Duarte Elementary

Alternative Education
Mt. Olive Continuation High School

See also
List of school districts in Los Angeles County, California

External links
 Duarte Unified School District Web Site

School districts in Los Angeles County, California
Duarte, California